Mark Barnett (born September 4, 1954) is an American attorney; the 28th attorney general of South Dakota between 1991 and 2003 and a circuit court judge between 2007 and 2019.

Legal career
Barnett, a Republican, graduated from the University of South Dakota School of Law.

Electoral history

1990 attorney general election
Barnett won the general election by defeating Michael Butler. He won with 150,109 (59.49%) votes while Butler received 102,231 votes (40.51%).

1994 attorney general election
Barnett was re-elected by defeating Democrat Randy Turner and Libertarian Bert Olson. Barnett received 192,147 (62.33%) votes; Randy received 106,709 (34.62%) votes and Bert received 9,410 (3.05%) votes.

1998 attorney general election
Barnett was elected for a third term as attorney general. He was unopposed for the first time in the history of attorney general elections in South Dakota. 

As of October, 2019, Barnett is the longest-serving attorney general in South Dakota history, with 12 years of service.

Supreme Court litigation
Barnett argued two cases before the United States Supreme Court as attorney general, winning both cases.

South Dakota v. Bourland, 508 U.S. 679 (1993)
Barnett argued on behalf of the state, winning a 7–2 decision that the federal Flood Control and Cheyenne River Acts had abrogated the tribe's right, guaranteed under the Fort Laramie Treaty, to regulate hunting and fishing on their lands by non-Indians.

South Dakota v. Yankton Sioux Tribe, 522 U.S. 329 (1998)
Barnett argued that an 1894 federal statute, ratifying an agreement pursuant to the Dawes Act, had diminished the boundaries of the Yankton Sioux Reservation, as they had been established in an 1858 treaty. The Court ruled unanimously for the state.

2002 gubernatorial election
Barnett ran for governor, but finished second in a divisive three-way primary for the 2002 Republican nomination. Mike Rounds won the nomination with 49,331 (44.34%) votes; Barnett received 32,868 (29.54%) votes and former lieutenant governor Steve T. Kirby received 29,065 (26.12%).

State judicial service
In 2007, Barnett was appointed as a circuit court judge by Governor Mike Rounds. In 2014, he was reelected in an uncontested election. Barnett retired from the bench on March 22, 2019.

References

1954 births
Living people
South Dakota state court judges
South Dakota Attorneys General
South Dakota Republicans
University of South Dakota School of Law alumni
Politicians from Sioux Falls, South Dakota
20th-century American politicians
21st-century American politicians